The Ranger is a 2018 American slasher horror film written and directed by Jenn Wexler. It stars Chloë Levine as a punk who flees with her friends from the law to hide out at her late uncle's cabin in a national forest, and Jeremy Holm as the titular park ranger who responds in an unhinged manner. Wexler has described the concept of the film as an attempt to "blend the genres of 80s punk movies with 80s slashers".

Cast
Chloë Levine as Chelsea
Jeté Laurence as young Chelsea
Jeremy Holm as The Ranger
Amanda Grace Benitez as Amber
Granit Lahu as Garth
Jeremy Pope as Jerk
Bubba Weiler as Abe
Larry Fessenden as Uncle Pete
Clay McLeod Chapman as Alley cop
Jim Johnson as Cop
Nicholas Tucci as Flesh
John Mateer as Punk

References

External links

2018 horror films
Backwoods slasher films
Films set in forests
American slasher films
Punk films
2010s slasher films
2010s English-language films
2010s American films